Bis(triphenylphosphineoxide) manganese(III) chloride is a coordination complex of manganese(III) chloride. Unlike most compounds containing "Mn(III)Cl3", [MnCl3(OPPh3)2] can be stored under normal laboratory conditions.  It is a blue, paramagnetic solid.

Synthesis and reactions
Treatment of meta-stable solutions of Mn(III)Cl3 with triphenylphosphine oxide results in precipitation of solid [MnCl3(OPPh3)2].  This compound was first prepared using the thermally unstable ethereal adduct (dioxane)Mn(III)Cl3. A convenient synthesis starts from Mn(OAc)2, trimethylsilylchloride, and potassium permanganate.

[MnCl3(OPPh3)2] can be used as a starting material in coordination chemistry.

[MnCl3(OPPh3)2] can also be used as a stoichiometric reagent in alkene dihalogenation reactions.

References 

Manganese(III) compounds
Chlorides